The 1938 British Isles tour to South Africa was the fourteenth tour by a British Isles team and the sixth to South Africa. The tour is retrospectively classed as one of the British Lions tours, as the Lions naming convention was not adopted until 1950.

The tour party was led by Ireland's Sam Walker and managed by Col. Hartley, and took in 24 matches. Of the 24 games, 19 were against club or invitational teams, three were test matches against the South African national team and the other two games were outside South Africa against Rhodesia. The British Isles lost two and won one of the test matches, and in the non-test games lost five and won sixteen.

Like many of the early Lions parties, the tour did not represent the best of British and Irish rugby talent. Obvious omissions included Wilf Wooller and Cliff Jones.

Touring party

Manager: Col. Bernard Charles Hartley

Full Backs
 Vivian Jenkins (London Welsh)
 Charles Frederick Grieve (Oxford University and )

Three-Quarters
 Jim Unwin (Rosslyn Park)
 Bill Clement (Llanelli)
 Elvet Jones (Llanelli)
 Charles Vesey Boyle (Dublin University)
 Roy Leyland (Waterloo)
 D.J. Macrae (St. Andrew's University)
 Harry McKibbin (Queen's University, Belfast)
 Basil Ellard Nicholson (Old Whitgiftians)

Half backs
 Frank Jeffrey "Jeff" Reynolds (Old Cranleighans)
 George Ernest Cromey (Queen's University, Belfast)
 James "Jimmy" Leonard Giles (Coventry)
 Haydn Tanner (Swansea)
 George J Morgan (Clontarf)

Forwards
 Sam Walker (Instonians) (captain)
 Eddie Morgan (Swansea)
 William Gordon Howard (Old Birkonians)
 William 'Bunner' Travers (Newport)
 Charles Robert "Bob" Arthur Graves (Wanderers)
 Paddy Mayne (Queen's University)
 Gerald "Beef" Thomas Dancer (Bedford)
 S.R. Couchman (Old Cranleighans)
 A.G. Purchas (Coventry)
 J.A. Waters (Selkirk)
 P.L. Duff (Glasgow Academicals)
 Ivor Williams (Cardiff)
 Russell Taylor (Cross Keys)
 Robert Alexander (North of Ireland)

Match summary
Complete list of matches played by the British Isles in South Africa:

 Test matches

Test details

First Test

South Africa: G.H Brand, F.G Turner, G.P Lochner, P de Wet, D.O Williams, T.A Harris, D.H Craven (Captain), S.C Louw, J.W Lotz, M.M Louw, B.A du Toit, W.F Bergh, A.R Sherriff, W.E Bastard, L.C Strachan

British Isles: V..G.J Jenkins, E.J Unwin, D.J Macrae, H.R McKibbon, E.L Jones, F.J Reynolds, J.L Giles, M.E Morgan, C.R.A Graves, G.T Dancer, S Walker (Captain), R.B Mayne, R. Alexander, W.G Howard, A.R

References

British Lions tour
British & Irish Lions tours of South Africa
Rugby union tours of Zimbabwe
1938 in South African rugby union
1937–38 in British rugby union
1938 in Irish sport